Rabbinic literature, in its broadest sense, is the entire spectrum of rabbinic writings throughout Jewish history. However, the term often refers specifically to literature from the Talmudic era, as opposed to medieval and modern rabbinic writing, and thus corresponds with the Hebrew term Sifrut Chazal ( "Literature [of our] sages," where Hazal normally refers only to the sages of the Talmudic era). This more specific sense of "Rabbinic literature"—referring to the Talmudim, Midrash, and related writings, but hardly ever to later texts—is how the term is generally intended when used in contemporary academic writing.  The terms mefareshim and parshanim (commentaries/commentators) almost always refer to later, post-Talmudic writers of rabbinic glosses on Biblical and Talmudic texts.

Mishnaic literature
The Midr'she halakha, Mishnah, and Tosefta (compiled from materials pre-dating the year 200 CE) are the earliest extant works of rabbinic literature, expounding and developing Judaism's Oral Law, as well as ethical teachings. Following these came the two Talmuds:
The Jerusalem Talmud, c. 450 CE
The Babylonian Talmud, full canonization of all the previous texts  c. 600 CE.
The minor tractates (part of the Babylonian Talmud)

The Midrash

Midrash (pl. Midrashim) is a Hebrew word referring to a method of reading details into, or out of, a biblical text. The term midrash also can refer to a compilation of Midrashic teachings, in the form of legal, exegetical, homiletical, or narrative writing, often configured as a commentary on the Bible or Mishnah.  There are a large number of "classical" Midrashic works spanning a period from Mishnaic to Geonic times, often showing evidence of having been worked and reworked from earlier materials, and frequently coming to us in multiple variants. A compact list of these works [based on ] is given below; a more thorough annotated list can be found under Midrash. The timeline below must be approximate because many of these works were composed over a long span of time, borrowing and collating material from earlier versions; their histories are therefore somewhat uncertain and the subject of scholarly debate. In the table, "n.e." designates that the work in question is not extant except in secondary references.

Later works by category

Aggada 

Alphabet of Rabbi Akiva
Ein Yaakov
Legends of the Jews
Midrash HaGadol
Midrash Hashkem
Midrash Rabba
Midrash Shmuel
Midrash Tehillim
Pesikta de-Rav Kahana
Pesikta Rabbati
Pirke De-Rabbi Eliezer
Seder Olam Rabbah
Seder Olam Zutta
Sefer HaAggadah
Sefer haYashar (midrash)
Smaller midrashim
Tanhuma
Tanna Devei Eliyahu
Tseno Ureno
Yalkut Shimoni

Hasidic thought 

 Keter Shem Tov
 Tzavaat HaRivash
 Toledot Yaakov Yosef
 Ben Porat Yosef
 Tzafnat Paneach
 Ketonet Pasim
 Magid Devarav L'Yaakov
 Or Torah
Menachem Zion
 Meor Einayim and Yesamach Lev
 Noam Elimelech
 Menorat Zahav
 Avodat Yisrael
 Pri Ha'Aretz and P'ri Ha'Eitz
 Kedushas Levi
 Bet Aharon
 Yosher Divrei Emes
 Tanya (Likutei Amarim) 
 Torah Or/Likutei Torah
 Likutei Moharan
 Sichot HaRan
 Be'er Mayim Hayyim
 Siduro Shel Shabbos
 Avodas HaLevi
 Mei Hashiloach
 Kol Simcha
 Bnei Yissachar
 Imrei Elimelech and Divrei Elimelech
 Aish Kodesh
 Sefas Emes
 Imrei Emes
 Shem Mishmuel
 Likkutei Sichos
 Netivot Shalom
 Darchei Noam

Hebrew poetry 

Biblical poetry
Medieval Hebrew poetry

Jewish liturgy

Piyyut
Siddur

Jewish philosophy 

Chovot HaLevavot
Derech Hashem
Emunah Ubitachon
Emunot v'Dayyot
Kad ha-Kemach
Kuzari
Moreh Nevukhim (Guide for the Perplexed)
Milchamot Hashem (Wars of the Lord)
Nefesh Ha-Chaim
Or Adonai
Perek Chelek
Philo
Sefer ha-Ikkarim

Kabbalah 

Etz Chaim
Maggid Mesharim
Pardes Rimonim
Sefer haBahir
Sefer Raziel HaMalakh
Sefer Yetzirah
Tikunei haZohar
Tomer Devorah
Zohar

Jewish law 

Arba'ah Turim
Aruch HaShulchan
Beit Yosef
Ben Ish Hai
Chayei Adam and Chochmat Adam
Darkhei Moshe
Halachot Gedolot
Kaf HaChaim
Hilchot HaRif
Kessef Mishneh
Kitzur Shulchan Aruch
Levush Malchut 
Minchat Chinuch
Mishnah Berurah
Mishneh Torah
Responsa literature
Sefer ha-Chinuch
Sefer Hamitzvot
Sefer Mitzvot Gadol
Shulchan Aruch
Shulchan Aruch HaRav
Yalkut Yosef

Musar literature 

Mesillat Yesharim
Orchot Tzaddikim
Sefer Chasidim
Shaarei Teshuva
Sefer ha-Yir'ah
Chovot ha-Levavot
Ma'alot ha-Middot
Mishnat R' Aharon
Mikhtav me-Eliyahu
Tomer Devorah
Sichos Mussar 
Pele Yoetz
Kav ha-Yashar
Kad HaKemah
Madreigat Ha'Adam
Shemonah Perakim

Later works by historical period

Works of the Geonim
The Geonim are the rabbis of Sura and Pumbeditha, in Babylon (650 - 1250) :
She'iltoth of Acha'i [Gaon]
Halachot Gedolot
Halachot Pesukot, by Rav Yehudai Gaon
Emunoth ve-Deoth (Saadia Gaon)
The Siddur by Amram Gaon
Responsa

Works of the Rishonim (the "early" rabbinical commentators)
The Rishonim are the rabbis of the early medieval period (1000 - 1550)
The commentaries on the Torah, such as those by Rashi, Abraham ibn Ezra and Nahmanides.
Commentaries on the Talmud, principally by Rashi, his grandson Samuel ben Meir and Nissim of Gerona.
Commentaries on the Mishnah, such as those composed by Maimonides, Obadiah of Bertinoro, and Nathan ben Abraham
Talmudic novellae (chiddushim) by Tosafists, Nahmanides, Nissim of Gerona, Solomon ben Aderet (RaShBA), Yomtov ben Ashbili (Ritva)
Works of halakha (Asher ben Yechiel, Mordechai ben Hillel)
Codices by Maimonides and Jacob ben Asher, and finally Shulkhan Arukh
Responsa, e.g. by Solomon ben Aderet (RaShBA)
Kabbalistic works (such as the Zohar)
Philosophical works (Maimonides, Gersonides, Nahmanides)
Ethical works (Bahya ibn Paquda, Jonah of Gerona)

Works of the Acharonim (the "later" rabbinical commentators)
The Acharonim are the rabbis from 1550 to the present day.
Important Torah commentaries include Keli Yakar (Shlomo Ephraim Luntschitz), Ohr ha-Chayim by Chayim ben-Attar, the commentary of Samson Raphael Hirsch, and the commentary of Naftali Zvi Yehuda Berlin.
Important works of Talmudic novellae include: Pnei Yehoshua, Hafla'ah, Sha'agath Aryei
Responsa, e.g. by Moses Sofer, Moshe Feinstein
Works of halakha and codices e.g. Mishnah Berurah by Yisrael Meir Kagan and the Aruch ha-Shulchan by Yechiel Michel Epstein
Ethical and philosophical works: Moshe Chaim Luzzatto, Yisrael Meir Kagan and the Mussar Movement
Hasidic works (Kedushath Levi, Sefath Emmeth, Shem mi-Shemuel)
Philosophical/metaphysical works (the works of the Maharal of Prague, Moshe Chaim Luzzatto and Nefesh ha-Chayim by Chaim of Volozhin)
Mystical works
Historical works, e.g. Shem ha-Gedolim by Chaim Joseph David Azulai.

Mefareshim
Mefareshim is a Hebrew word meaning "commentators" (or roughly meaning "exegetes"), Perushim means "commentaries". In Judaism these words refer to commentaries on the Torah (five books of Moses), Tanakh, Mishnah, Talmud, the responsa literature, or even the siddur (Jewish prayerbook), and more.

Classic Torah and Talmud commentaries
Classic Torah and/or Talmud commentaries have been written by the following individuals:
 Geonim
 Saadia Gaon, 10th century Babylon
 Rishonim
 Rashi (Shlomo Yitzchaki), 12th century France
 Abraham ibn Ezra
 Nachmanides (Moshe ben Nahman)
 Samuel ben Meir, the Rashbam, 12th century France
 Gersonides, also known as Levi ben Gershom  or Ralbag) 
 David Kimhi, the Radak, 13th century France
 Joseph ben Isaac Bekhor Shor, 12th century France
 Nissim of Gerona, also known as  Nissim ben Reuben Gerondi, or the RaN, 14th century Spain
 Isaac Abarbanel (1437–1508)
 Obadiah ben Jacob Sforno, 16th century Italy
 Acharonim
 The Vilna Gaon, also known as Elijah ben Solomon Zalman, 18th century Lithuania
 The Malbim, Meir Leibush ben Yehiel Michel Wisser

Classical Talmudic commentaries were written by Rashi. After Rashi the Tosafot were written, which was an omnibus commentary on the Talmud by the disciples and descendants of Rashi; this commentary was based on discussions done in the rabbinic academies of Germany and France.

Modern Torah commentaries
Modern Torah commentaries which have received wide acclaim in the Jewish community include:

Haemek Davar by Rabbi Naftali Zvi Yehuda Berlin
The Chofetz Chaim
Torah Temimah of Baruch ha-Levi Epstein
Kerem HaTzvi, by Rabbi Tzvi Hirsch Ferber
Sefat Emet (Lips of Truth), Yehudah Aryeh Leib of Ger, 19th century Europe
The "Pentateuch and Haftaras" by Joseph H. Hertz
Uebersetzung und Erklärung des Pentateuchs ("Translation and Commentary of the Pentateuch") by Samson Raphael Hirsch
Nechama Leibowitz, a noted woman scholar
HaTorah vehaMitzva ("The Torah and the Commandment")  by Meïr Leibush, the "Malbim"
Ha-Ketav veha-Kabbalah by Rabbi Yaakov Tzvi Mecklenburg
The Soncino Books of the Bible
Richard Elliot Friedman's Commentary on the Torah (2001)

Modern Siddur commentaries
Modern Siddur commentaries have been written by:
Rabbi Yisrael Meir Kagan HaCohen, The Chofetz Chaim's Siddur
Samson Raphael Hirsch, The Hirsch Siddur, Feldheim
Abraham Isaac Kook, Olat Reyia
The Authorised Daily Prayer Book with commentary by Joseph H. Hertz
Elie Munk, The World of Prayer, Elie Munk
Nosson Scherman, The Artscroll Siddur, Mesorah Publications
Jonathan Sacks, in the Authorised Daily Prayer Book of the British Commonwealth (the new version of "Singer's Prayer Book") as well as the Koren Sacks Siddur.
Reuven Hammer, Or Hadash, a siddur commentary built around the text of Siddur Sim Shalom, United Synagogue of Conservative Judaism
My Peoples Prayer Book, Jewish Lights Publishing, written by a team of non-Orthodox rabbis and Talmud scholars.

See also

 Jewish commentaries on the Bible
 Judaism #Jewish religious texts
 List of Jewish prayers and blessings
 List of rabbis
 Rabbinic Judaism
 Torah databases (electronic versions of traditional Jewish texts)
 Yeshiva #Curriculum

Biblical figures in rabbinic literature
 Adam in rabbinic literature
 Daniel in rabbinic literature
 Esther in rabbinic literature
 Ezra in rabbinic literature
 Haman in rabbinic literature
 Jethro in rabbinic literature
 Joab in rabbinic literature
 Job in rabbinic literature
 Moses in rabbinic literature
 Noah in rabbinic literature
 Samson in rabbinic literature
 Simeon in rabbinic literature

Bibliography
Back to the Sources: Reading the Classic Jewish Texts, Barry W. Holtz, (Summit Books)
Introduction to Rabbinic Literature Jacob Neusner, (Anchor Bible Reference Library/Doubleday)
Introduction to the Talmud and Midrash, H. L. Strack and G. Stemberger, (Fortress Press)
The Literature of the Sages: Oral Torah, Halakha, Mishnah, Tosefta, Talmud, External Tractates, Shemuel Safrai and Peter J. Tomson (Fortress, 1987)

External links

General
A survey of rabbinic literature
A timeline of Jewish texts
Comprehensive listing by category - Global Jewish Database
Judaica archival project
Chapters On Jewish Literature
Online Resources for the Study of Rabbinic Literature

Links to full text resources
The Sefaria Library
Mechon Mamre
Sages of Ashkenaz Database
Halacha Brura and Birur Halacha Institute
The Electronic Torah Warehouse
hebrewbooks.org
seforimonline.org
Primary Sources @ Ben Gurion University 
Young Israel library

Glossaries
Judaic glossary
Sources@JTS
Glossary/Bibliography

 
Ancient Hebrew texts
Chazal